Femi Jacobs (born Oluwafemisola Jacobs; 8 May) is a Nigerian actor, speaker and singer. He came into prominence for playing Makinde Esho in the film The Meeting, which also stars Rita Dominic and Jide Kosoko. For his role in The Meeting, he received a nomination for Best Actor in a Leading Role at the 9th Africa Movie Academy Awards. He also won the award for Best Actor in a Comedy at the 2015 Africa Magic Viewers Choice Awards (AMVCA).

Biography
Femi attended Fakunle Comprehensive high school, Osogbo in Osun State of Nigeria. 
Jacobs studied mass communication at Lagos State University.

Accolades
For his role in The Meeting, he received a nomination for Best Actor in a Leading Role at the 9th Africa Movie Academy Awards. He also received nominations for Best Lead Actor in a Film at the 2013 Nigeria Entertainment Awards, for Favourite Male African International Emerging Screen Talent at the 2014 Screen Nation Awards, and for Best Supporting Actor of the Year at the 2015 City People Entertainment Awards. He won the award for Best Actor in a Comedy at the 2015 Africa Magic Viewers Choice Awards (AMVCA) and Best Supporting Actor (English) at the 2014 Best of Nollywood Awards (BON).

Filmography

Television
Tinsel (as Eddie Edoma)
Tango (2008)
Middlemen (2014)
This Thing Called Marriage (2015)
Binary Unit (2015)
Unmarried (2019 -)

Films
The Meeting (2012)
Choices (2006)
Tunnel
Paired
Dreamwalker (2012)
Journey to Self (2013)
Render to Caesar (2014)
Heaven's Hell (2015)
The Black Sihouette (2015)
The Guest (2015)
The Visit (2015)
Iquo's Journal (2015)
Taxi Driver: Oko Ashewo (2015)
Just Married (2015)
Heart of a Sister (2015)
All Shades of Wrong
Looking For Baami
Eagle Wings
Introducing the Kujus
The New Normal (2020 film)

Awards and nominations

See also
 List of Nigerian actors

References

External links

Nigerian male film actors
Yoruba male actors
Lagos State University alumni
21st-century Nigerian male actors
Living people
Year of birth missing (living people)
Nigerian male television actors
Nigerian gospel singers
Yoruba musicians
Male actors in Yoruba cinema